Wang Hao may refer to:

Sports
Wang Hao (swimmer) (born 1962), Chinese
Wang Hao (table tennis, born 1966), Chinese
Wang Hao (table tennis, born 1983), Chinese
Wang Hao (racewalker) (born 1989), Chinese
Wang Hao (chess player) (born 1989), Chinese chess grandmaster
Wang Hao (footballer, born 1989), Chinese
Wang Hao (footballer, born 1993), Chinese
Wang Hao (diver) (born 1992), Chinese
Wang Hao (canoeist) (born 1993), Chinese sprint canoeist
Wang Hao (Paralympic athlete) (born 1995), Chinese Paralympic athlete (2020 Summer Paralympics: Opening Ceremony flag-bearer)

Other
Wang Hao (singer) (born 1987), Chinese boy band singer
Hao Wang (academic) (1921–1995), Chinese American logician, philosopher, and mathematician
Wang Hao (politician) (born 1963), Chinese politician
Wang Hao (born 1930), major general of the People's Liberation Army.